Bodkin Ras is a 2016 Dutch and Belgian film directed by Kaweh Modiri and starring Sohrab Bayat, Lily Szramko, James Macmillan, and Eddie Paton. It premiered in March 2016 at the 45th International Film Festival Rotterdam where it won the International FIPRESCI award, and had its North American premiere in March 2016 at SXSW 2016, Austin, Texas, United States.

References

2016 films
Belgian thriller films
Dutch thriller films
2010s English-language films